Stourbridge is a market town in the Metropolitan Borough of Dudley in the West Midlands, England, situated on the River Stour. Historically in Worcestershire, it was the centre of British glass making during the Industrial Revolution. The 2011 UK census recorded the town's population as 63,298.

Geography
It is part of the Metropolitan Borough of Dudley at the southwestern edge of the Black Country and West Midlands conurbation, Stourbridge includes the villages and suburbs of Amblecote, Lye, Norton, Oldswinford, Pedmore, Stambermill, Stourton, Wollaston, Wollescote and Wordsley.

Much of Stourbridge consists of residential streets interspersed with green spaces. Mary Stevens Park, opened in 1931, has a lake, a bandstand, a cafe, and a mixture of open spaces and woodland.

Bordered by green belt land, Stourbridge is close to countryside with the Clent Hills to the south and southwest Staffordshire and Kinver Edge to the west.

Closest cities, towns and villages

History

Stourbridge was listed in the 1255 Worcestershire assize roll as Sturbrug or Sturesbridge. The medieval township was named for a bridge which crossed the River Stour. It lay within the manor of Swynford or Suineford (now Old Swinford), which appears in William the Conqueror's Domesday Book of 1086.

Pigot and Co.'s National Commercial Directory for 1828-9 describes Stourbridge as a "populous, wealthy, and flourishing market town" and gives its population in 1821 as 5,090. 

In 1966, the Stourbridge border between Worcestershire and Staffordshire, which for centuries had been marked by the River Stour, was moved a couple of miles north when Amblecote was incorporated into the Borough of Stourbridge. Following the Local Government Act 1972, Stourbridge was amalgamated into the Metropolitan Borough of Dudley and became part of the wider West Midlands county in 1974.

Glass Making in Stourbridge
The town gives its name to local glass production, which has been manufactured since the early 1600s. The local clay proved particularly suitable for the industry, taken up predominantly after the immigration of French coal miners in the Huguenot diaspora. However, most of the glass industry was actually located in surrounding areas including Wordsley, Amblecote and Oldswinford. The rich natural resources of coal and fireclay for lining furnaces made it the perfect location for the industry. Glass making peaked in the 19th century, encouraged by the famous glass-making family, the Jeavons.

The 1861 census identified that 1,032 residents of Stourbridge were involved in the glass trade in some way. Of these, 541 were glass workers - an increase from 409 in 1851, believed to be partly caused by the collapse of the glass industry in nearby Dudley in the 1850s. The vast majority of those involved in the glass trade came from Staffordshire, Warwickshire, Worcestershire and Shropshire. 9% came from other parts of England and 0.2% had come from abroad. Of particular note are glass cutters, as 8.1% had come from Ireland, believed to be as a result of the decline of the Irish glasscutting industry in the first half of the 1800s. The houses inhabited by glassworkers were of a much better quality in comparison to the slums in which the nailmakers of Lye and Wollescote lived. However, only a few glassworkers owned their own houses.

The Red House Cone, thought to be the only complete remaining glass cone of its kind, stands on the Stourbridge Canal at Wordsley. It is the site of the Red House Glass Museum and there are regular demonstrations of traditional glass blowing.

Present

The town centre has seen major regeneration in recent years. In 2014, Lion Health medical centre opened in the renovated former foundry of Foster, Rastrick and Company – where the Stourbridge Lion locomotive was manufactured. The next phase of regeneration on the foundry site will create parkland next to Stourbridge Canal with a "heritage and community hub" named Riverside House.

Crown Centre Shopping Mall at the bottom of Stourbridge High Street opened in 2013 at the site of the old Crown Centre and Bell Street multi-storey car park, which were demolished between 2012 and 2013. Costing £50m, the new mall is home to a  Tesco anchor store, a two-level underground car park, six retail stores and a central food court.  The Tesco store occupies much of the footprint of the former Safeway supermarket which had closed in 2004. Stourbridge Bus Station underwent substantial redevelopment and re-opened as Stourbridge Interchange in April 2012.

In 2010, Stourbridge was awarded Fairtrade Town status. Stourbridge Farmers' and Craft Market takes place on the first and third Saturday of every month in the Clock Square. Throughout the summer, Mary Stevens Park hosts outdoor live music.

In the 2011 Census, the average age of people in Stourbridge was 42.

Conservative MP Margot James held the Stourbridge parliamentary constituency 2010–2019. She was succeeded in 2019 by Suzanne Webb of the same party.

Transport

Three main roads meet in Stourbridge,  these being the A451, the A458 and the A491, the last forming the one way Stourbridge Ring Road.

Stourbridge has two railway stations, the main one being Stourbridge Junction. From here, it is around 30 minutes to Birmingham, 30 minutes to Worcester and between two and 2.5 hours to London. The other station, Stourbridge Town, is served only by a shuttle to and from Stourbridge Junction. The former main line to Wolverhampton via Dudley, and branches to Wombourne and Walsall closed in the 1960s. However the line towards Dudley remains open for freight as far as the Round Oak Steel Terminal north of Brierley Hill. In January 2021, proposals were made to reopen the line to Brierley Hill to passengers using a light rail vehicle similar to that used on the Stourbridge Branch Line.

Stourbridge Interchange is the main bus station, located in the town centre next to Stourbridge Town railway station. The Interchange opened in 2012 at a cost of £7 million. Most services are operated by National Express West Midlands and Diamond Bus.

By bike, National Route 54 of the National Cycle Network links Stourbridge with Dudley via the canal towpaths.

The Stourbridge Canal links the town to the Staffordshire and Worcestershire Canal and the Dudley No. 1 Canal. This places Stourbridge on the Stourport Ring, navigable by narrowboat and popular with holidaymakers.

Former routes

Education

There is one college in Stourbridge. King Edward VI College was founded in 1552, becoming a sixth form college in 1976. Stourbridge College, south of the town centre, was formed in 1958 and specialised in art and design, but was closed in 2019.

There is also a sixth form at Old Swinford Hospital school, which was founded in 1667 by the Stourbridge-born politician Thomas Foley. The boarding school was named the best secondary school in Dudley, closely followed by Redhill School, an academy also in Stourbridge.

Elmfield Rudolf Steiner School is an independent school which follows the international Steiner Waldorf Education curriculum.

Culture

Festival of Glass
The International Festival of Glass is held at Ruskin Mill in Stourbridge every two years.  Launched in 2004, it showcases the skill and innovation of glass artists, designers and craftspeople.

The British Glass Biennale is the festival's flagship exhibition, featuring contemporary work by glass makers in the UK. The exhibition attracts collectors, galleries and museums from around the world.

Music
In the late-1980s and early 1990s, three Stourbridge indie bands – The Wonder Stuff, Pop Will Eat Itself and Ned's Atomic Dustbin – all had chart success, selling millions of albums between them and gracing the covers of NME and Melody Maker. Pop Will Eat Itself's former frontman Clint Mansell has since composed musical scores for films including Black Swan and Requiem for a Dream.

The 80s metal bands Diamond Head, Witchfinder General and 80s pop band Kayran Dache also came from Stourbridge and Led Zeppelin's Robert Plant once attended King Edward VI College (then King Edward VI Grammar School for Boys).

Media
Stourbridge is covered by three newspapers: the Express & Star (daily), the Stourbridge News (weekly), and the Stourbridge Chronicle (weekly). Two news websites – BBC Birmingham & Black Country and Black Country Live, launched in 2019 – also cover the area.

In addition, Stourbridge is served by commercial radio stations broadcasting from Wolverhampton, Brierley Hill and Birmingham as well as three BBC Local Radio stations: BBC Hereford and Worcester, BBC Radio Shropshire and BBC WM.

From the 1860s until the early 1980s, Stourbridge was covered by the County Express newspaper. The archives are now on microfilm in Stourbridge Library.

Sport
Stourbridge Football Club, founded in 1876 and nicknamed "The Glassboys", shares the War Memorial Athletic Ground in Amblecote with Stourbridge Cricket Club. Stourbridge Rugby Club play at Stourton Park in nearby Stourton. Dudley and Stourbridge Harriers have trained at the Dell Stadium since 1964. Other teams include Redhill Volleyball Club, which plays at Redhill School. Stourbridge Running Club also train at the War Memorial in Amblecote.

Places of Interest

 Black Country Living Museum
 The Bonded Warehouse
 Clent Hills
 Crystal Leisure Centre
 Hagley Hall
 Kinver Edge Rock Houses
 Mary Stevens Park
 Red House Cone
 Ruskin Glass Centre
 Stambermill Viaduct
 Stourbridge Canal
 Stourbridge Town Hall
 Wychbury Hill
The River Stour ( Stambermill Woods )

Places of Worship
According to the 2011 Census, the majority of people living in Stourbridge identify as Christian (65%). Almost a quarter of people said they had no religion. Less than 1% of people identified as Muslim, Sikh, Buddhist, or Hindu. 43 people identified as a Jedi Knight.

Chawn Hill Church, Stourbridge
Ghausia Jamia Mosque, Lye
Holy Trinity Church, Amblecote
Hope Baptist Church, Stourbridge
Our Lady and All Saints Catholic Church, Stourbridge
Presbyterian Unitarian Chapel, Stourbridge. 
Quaker Meeting House, Stourbridge
St James' Church, Wollaston
St Mary's, Oldswinford
St Thomas' Church, Stourbridge
St Peter's, Pedmore

Notable residents
Business
 James Foster, ironmaster, mine operator and banker. He was instrumental in bringing the first commercial steam locomotive into the Midlands
 Thomas Webb, founder of Thomas Webb & Sons
Entertainment
 Kenton Allen, television producer and executive (The Royle Family, Six Shooter), attended King Edward VI College
Performing arts
 Walter Braithwaite, composer, pianist, teacher and co-founder of the Elmfield Rudolf Steiner School, Stourbridge
 Johnny Briggs, actor, Coronation Street
 Dave Cartwright, singer-songwriter, broadcaster and author
  Phil Cope, lead guitarist for Doom Metal band Witchfinder General
 Clint Mansell, English musician, composer, and former lead singer and guitarist of the band Pop Will Eat Itself, attended King Edward VI College
 Jan Pearson, actress, Holby City, Doctors, born in Wollaston
 Jonn Penney, musician - Ned's Atomic Dustbin
 Robert Plant, singer with Led Zeppelin, attended King Edward VI College
 Esther Smith, actress known for her work in the television series Uncle and Cuckoo
 Luke Dalton, actor/musician known for his work in the television series War Above the Trenches

Science and academia
 Kathleen Booth, inventor of the first computer assembly language 
 Kay Davies, geneticist
 David Trotman, pure mathematician, attended King Edward VI College
 Clement Lindley Wragge, meteorologist
Sports and games
 Don Kenyon, cricketer, captain of Worcestershire
 Matt Neal, motor racing driver
 Dan O'Hagan, BBC Match of the Day football commentator
 Ronnie O'Sullivan, snooker player, born in Wordsley Hospital in 1975
 Jude Bellingham, professional footballer, born in Stourbridge
 Alf Bishop, born in Stourbridge, professional footballer Wolverhampton Wanderers 
 Matthew Round-Garrido, motor racing driver 
Writers
 Jerome K. Jerome, author Three Men in a Boat, lived at Stourbridge in childhood before his family moved to London
 Samuel Johnson lived and worked in Stourbridge for a time
 David Massey, author of Torn and Taken published worldwide by The Chicken House
 S. J. Watson, author of Before I Go to Sleep
 Brett Westwood, radio presenter and author
Others
 William Henry Bury, murderer and Jack the Ripper suspect
 Frank Foley, the relatively little-known "British Schindler" retired to Stourbridge. There is a memorial to him in Mary Stevens Park
 Rachel Trevor-Morgan, milliner to the Queen

In popular culture
The fictional Middle-earth world of Mordor in The Lord of the Rings trilogy is believed to have been inspired by the Black Country of the Victorian era. Author J. R. R. Tolkien grew up in the area.
Scenes from the TV series Peaky Blinders have been shot at the Black Country Living Museum in nearby Dudley.
In other literature, Stourbridge appears in Finnegans Wake by James Joyce, published in 1939 (part 1, episode 6, page 184).

The town also gets a mention in The Cantos of Ezra Pound, a long, incomplete poem mostly written between 1915 and 1962 (Canto LXVI, line 30, page 380). Pound's epic poem is inspired by a diary entry from 1786 written by John Adams, the second President of the United States, which mentions Stourbridge.

Stourbridge Golf Course is also mentioned by P. G. Wodehouse in Money for Nothing, published in 1928 (chapter 5).

References

External links

 Internet Guide To Stourbridge

 
Towns in the West Midlands (county)
Areas of Dudley
Unparished areas in the West Midlands (county)